In shogi, Climbing Gold (棒金 bōkin) is a strategy used in different openings in which the Static Rook player advances their right gold up the second file if played by Black or the eighth file if played by White supported by the player's rook.

For example, the Climbing Gold may be a useful strategy to counteract an opponent's Ishida formation.

See also

 Climbing Silver
 Ishida (shogi)
 Static Rook

Bibliography

 勝又清和、2003、『消えた戦法の謎』文庫版、 毎日コミュニケーションズ  1995年のものの加筆・文庫版
 
 

Shogi openings
Static Rook openings